This was the first edition of this tournament.

Eva Birnerová and Petra Cetkovská won the tournament defeating Regina Kulikova and Evgeniya Rodina 6–3, 6–2.

Seeds

Draw

Draw

References
 Doubles Draw

Nottingham Challenge - Doubles
Nottingham Challenge - Doubles
2011 Women's Doubles